Shanghai Airlines is an airline headquartered in Shanghai. It is a wholly owned subsidiary of China Eastern Airlines, but its operations remain separate post-merger, retaining its distinct brand and livery. Shanghai Airlines operates domestic and international services. The logo is a white crane on a red vertical tail fin. The airline operates flights out of Shanghai Pudong International Airport and Shanghai Hongqiao International Airport in Shanghai. The airline is an affiliate member of the SkyTeam airline alliance with its parent company China Eastern Airlines which is a full member of the alliance.

History 
Shanghai Airlines was established in 1985. It is China's first commercial airline of multidimensional investment funded by the Shanghai municipal government and Shanghai local enterprises. The airline was initially restricted to domestic flights, but has operated international services since 1997.

In late 2002, Shanghai Airlines was successfully listed on the Shanghai Stock Exchange, which enabled the airline to fuel its further expansion. In 2006, the airline's cargo subsidiary was founded.

On 12 December 2007, Shanghai Airlines was officially welcomed as the 19th member of Star Alliance, which consolidated the alliance's presence in the Shanghai market.

On 11 June 2009, it was announced that Shanghai Airlines would merge with China Eastern Airlines. The merger of the two airlines was expected to reduce excess competition between the two Shanghai-based carriers, and allow them to compete more effectively with domestic rivals Air China and China Southern Airlines. It was also aimed at consolidating Shanghai's status as an international aviation hub.

In February 2010, the merger was completed. Shanghai Airlines was delisted from the Shanghai Stock Exchange and became a wholly owned subsidiary of China Eastern Airlines. The new combined airline is expected to have over half of the market share in Shanghai. Prior to the merger it was headquartered in Jing'an District.

As a result of the merger with China Eastern Airlines, Shanghai Airlines reached an agreement with Star Alliance to terminate its membership. On 1 November 2010, the airline officially left the Star Alliance and announced its intention to join its parent company in SkyTeam. Shanghai Airlines also maintained its own cargo division, Shanghai Airlines Cargo, which was merged into China Cargo Airlines.

Destinations 

Shanghai Airlines has a substantial domestic network shared with its parent company China Eastern Airlines. The airline serves over 140 domestic and international destinations, giving access to more than 60 large and medium-sized cities in Mainland China and abroad. Its international flights focus on Hong Kong, Macau, Taiwan, Japan, South Korea, Indonesia, Singapore and Thailand. Shanghai Airlines also operates services from Shanghai to Melbourne Airport, Australia on behalf of China Eastern Airlines utilising its own aircraft and crew. From June 2019, Shanghai Airlines opened direct flights to Budapest Ferenc Liszt International Airport.

Codeshare agreements
Shanghai Airlines has codeshare agreements with the following airlines:

 China Airlines
 China Eastern Airlines
 Delta Air Lines
 Hong Kong Airlines
 Korean Air

Fleet

Current fleet

, Shanghai Airlines operates the following aircraft:

Former fleet

Shanghai Airlines has previously operated the following aircraft:

Frequent-flyer program
Crane Club was the frequent-flyer program of Shanghai Airlines prior to the merger with China Eastern Airlines. However, Shanghai Airlines announced in April 2011  that the Crane Club will be merged into China Eastern's Eastern Miles Program. It was officially merged into Eastern Miles on June 8, 2011. After the merger, members can earn and use their mileage on China Eastern's flights. The Crane Club had two tiers: Crane Club Gold and Silver.

Shanghai Airlines' frequent-flyer program is called Eastern Miles. After the merger with China Eastern Airlines, the frequent-flyer programs were also merged. Eastern Miles became the official frequent-flyer program of Shanghai Airlines on June 8, 2011. When enough miles are collected, members can be upgraded to VIP. VIP membership of Eastern Miles can be divided into three tiers: Platinum Card Membership, Golden Card membership and Silver Card membership.

References

External links

 Official website 

Airlines of China
Former Star Alliance members
Airlines established in 1985
Transport in Shanghai
Companies based in Shanghai
SkyTeam affiliate members
Chinese companies established in 1985
Chinese brands
2010 mergers and acquisitions